Comfort behaviours in animals are activities that help maintain the pelage, feathers, integuement or musculoskeletal system and increase the physical comfort of the animal.

Comfort behaviours are performed from an early age and change little during development. Several comfort behaviours are associated with the beginning of a rest period (e.g. grooming), whereas others are associated with the end of a rest period (e.g. stretching), possibly to prepare the body for escape or hunting. Others, (e.g. dust bathing) will be performed only when the appropriate internal and external stimuli are present (see also sham dustbathing). Animals generally perform comfort behaviours only when they are not engaged in essential activities (e.g. feeding, drinking, hunting, escape); these behaviours are therefore sometimes categorised as luxury activities. However, animals can be highly motivated to perform some comfort behaviours (e.g. dust bathing in hens), and conditions that thwart these behaviours (e.g. battery cages) are considered to have a negative influence on animal welfare.

Purpose 
There are many adaptive and functional purposes for comfort behaviours among a diverse group of animals. One function of comfort behaviours is hygiene, particularly in the form of ectoparasite removal. The animal removes the ectoparasites through the scratching or brushing of their own bodies, or the grooming of others. Through licking and brushing, animals such as the red squirrel clean wounds and remove dirt and debris from their bodies, also aiding in hygiene. Other physical purposes for comfort behaviours includes reduction in heart rates as seen in horses, and thermoregulation.

There are reproductive purposes for comfort behaviours in several types of animals. It is necessary in the search for mating partners in animals such as the wren, where reciprocal and continued preening is involved in mating. Similarly, in chickens, dust bathing occurs as female sexual behaviour. During gestation, grooming and licking of areas critical for reproduction is increased in rats. Finally, in cats, the mother cares for her newly born kittens through comfort behaviours, licking and rubbing the kitten's head.

Comfort behaviours can function to communicate socially during breeding season such as in the Degus, and form bonds and social structure within groups. It also can have implications on social outcomes of an animal. In infant monkeys it was found that contact comfort from their mothers was necessary to encourage positive social outcomes. The monkeys without those comfort behaviours developed fear and anxiety. This comfort behaviour has an important impact because in the absence of a mother, juvenile monkeys cling to each other for contact comfort.

Types

Autogrooming 

Autogrooming is any grooming behaviour performed by an animal on its own body. This behaviour typically includes licking, chewing, clawing, and rubbing. This comfort behaviour is typically performed for hygienic purposes as seen in the red squirrel. The red squirrel removes parasites and dirt from its fur by licking and chewing its body (tail, belly and genitals), scratching harder to reach areas (such as under the legs) with its claws, brushing and rubbing facial areas with its front paws, or shaking its body and brushing against objects. This self-grooming increases in frequency during the spring when more black flies are present in the environment. In some animals such as the rat, autogrooming can have reproductive purposes. During pregnancy, the frequency of autogrooming in the critical reproductive areas, (nipple lines, genitals, and pelvis), increases whereas the frequency of licking in the areas not critical for reproduction decreased. As pregnancy progressed, the rate of licking in the critical areas increases.

Allogrooming 

Allogrooming is any behaviour performed by one animal on another. This behaviour could include licking, rubbing or preening. Allogrooming can have a reproductive function such as seen in wrens. Reciprocal preening initiated by either males or females can aid in mating. Additionally, this comfort behaviour has a hygienic purpose as seen in red howlers and cats. In red howlers, the animals bodies, (including their necks, heads, shoulders and arms) to remove ectoparasites. In domestic cats, mothers lick and rub their kittens' heads to keep them clean. This maternal function soon evolves into a social function as the kittens begin to groom their mothers as well. This reciprocal grooming is a sign of affiliation and is necessary for group cohesion. Allopreening is similarly observed to have a social purpose in red howlers, showing that allogrooming has a variety of functions over a variety of species.

Dust bathing 
Dust bathing is the process of an animal covering themselves, or bathing themselves in dust. In bobwhite quail, the basic sequence of dust bathing is consistent with slight variations occurring in some components. The basic process for the quail is to peck at the dust, squat in the dust, disperse the dust over the body with its wings and feet, and shake off the dust. This process is linked to the oiling of the quail's feathers. Dustbathing is also shown to have a reproductive function. In degus, males dust bathed more frequently during the breeding season. This is thought to deposit scents on the ground that could deter intruding males, or attract potential female mates. Conversely, dustbathing is frequent in female chickens as a part of reproductive behaviour.

Wallowing 

Wallowing is characterized by the rolling or rubbing of an animal's body in mud or excrement (feces or urine). The process of wallowing for red deer includes, kicking and pawing at mud, kneeling in the mud, and lying down and rolling in the mud. For red deer, wallowing has a strong social function as it instills a social hierarchy and creates group cohesion. The young deers are integrated into the group through competition. The young deer initiates wallowing which attracts the dominant deer. It is here that competition is observed and integration of the young into the group occurs. Wallowing also occurs before group activity to help promote group cohesion and common activity synchronizes. In pigs, another function of wallowing is presented, thermoregulation. When presented with increased temperature and humidity, pigs will wallow to regulate their body temperature.

Gallery

See also
 Personal grooming
 Ethogram

References

Ethology